= Dixon Valve & Coupling Company =

American manufacturer and supplier of hose fittings and accessories

- Company type: Private
- Industry: Manufacturing
- Founded: 1916; 110 years ago in Philadelphia, Pennsylvania
- Founder: H. W. Goodall
- Headquarters: Chestertown, Maryland, United States
- Number of locations: 8 manufacturing, 12 sales and service offices
- Area served: Worldwide
- Key people: Richard L. Goodall (CEO), Robert Grace (President), Taylor Goodall (President)
- Products: couplings, fittings, hose assemblies, valves, hydraulic and pneumatic components
- Website: www.dixonvalve.com

Dixon Valve & Coupling Company is an American manufacturer and supplier of hose fittings and accessories. The company, often referred to as just Dixon, offers products for fire protection, food and pharma and biotech processing, dairy processing, beverage and brewery operations, industrial manufacturing, mining, construction, chemical processing, petroleum processing and refining, oilfields, mobile tankers and agricultural operations.

Dixon Valve, which was founded by H. W. Goodall in 1916, maintains manufacturing, warehouse, sales or service facilities in eleven U.S. states. It also has sales and service offices on five continents. Its international headquarters are in Chestertown, Maryland (USA).

== History ==
Dixon Valve & Coupling Company's headquarters in Chestertown, Maryland

Dixon Valve & Coupling Company was founded in 1916 to meet the demand for couplings for the mining, oil drilling, construction and rail transportation industries. During the company's early years through to 1950, it pioneered the development of various couplings and related products, including ground joint and air hammer couplings, malleable iron universal couplings with safety locking feature, steel combination nipples, steel hose menders, plated hose fittings, and dredge sleeve clamps.

After World War II, the company began expanding into international markets. In recent decades, it has continued to broaden its line offerings through new product introductions as well as corporate acquisitions.

=== Major milestones ===
- 1916: Dixon Valve & Coupling Co. founded in Philadelphia by H. W. Goodall.
- 1917: First rotary hose coupling patented.
- 1918: First publication of The Dixon Driller; with only two exceptions, the publication has been mailed every month since.
- 1929: Moves company headquarters to Hancock and Columbia Avenues in Philadelphia, Pennsylvania.
- 1934: Opens Dixon Ltd. in Canada, the company's first expansion outside the United States.
- 1940: Acquisition of Mulconroy Company and its Holedall couplings line.
- 1943-45: Nearly 100% of Dixon production goes toward military contracts.
- 1952: Acquisition of Buck Iron Company, a Pennsylvania metals foundry.
- 1954: Founder H.W. Goodall dies; R. B. Goodall becomes president and chief operating officer.
- 1955: Introduces Tuff-Lite line of nylon fittings - non-metallic hose fittings (Tuff-lite fittings).
- 1976: Corporate headquarters moves from Philadelphia, PA to Chestertown, Maryland.
- 1980: Enters cam and groove market and patents Boss-Lock, a fitting with a safety-locking handle.
- 1981: Dixon Adflow, Ltd. (now Dixon Group Europe) opens in Preston, United Kingdom.
- 1985: Acquisition of the Andrews line of cam and groove fittings from Parker Hannifin.
- 1992: Major renovation and updating of headquarters facility in Chestertown, Maryland.
- 1993: Acquisition of Perfecting Service Company, a North Carolina manufacturer (now Dixon Quick Coupling).
- 1994: R. B. Goodall dies. Sons Richard and Douglas become third-generation family leaders
- 1996: Acquisition of Australian-based Minsup (now Dixon Asia Pacific).
- 1999: Acquisition of American Coupling Company of Chicago (now Dixon Brass).
- 2000: Acquisition of Bayco Industries (now Dixon Bayco).
- 2003: Begins operations in Mexico with creation of Dixva subsidiary.
- 2005: Boss magazine launched, a quarterly publication of Dixon Valve that explores the world and its industries.
- 2006: Acquisition of Powhatan and integration of its product line with other fire protection industry products to form Dixon Powhatan (now Dixon Fire).
- 2007: Dixon Asia Pacific Private Limited incorporated.
- 2007: Dixon (Shanghai) Trading Company Limited established.
- 2008: Dixon Singapore established.
- 2011: Acquisition of Northline Couplings Systems (absorbed into Dixon Fire).
- 2012: Acquisition of Eagle America (now Dixon Eagle).
- 2013: Acquisition of Bearon Manufacturing, Inc..
- 2013: International sales office and warehouse opened in France.
- 2014: Vent-Lock safety cam and groove introduced.
- 2016: Dixon celebrates 100 years in U.S. manufacturing.
- 2017: Acquisition of Automated Design Services, Inc. (ADS Controls).
- 2017: Dixon introduces EZLink Armless cam and groove.
- 2017: Dixon officially breaks ground on a highly automated 150,000-square-foot distribution center in Chestertown, Maryland.
- 2018: Dixon begins construction on a 60,000-square-foot headquarters building in Chestertown, Maryland.
- 2019: Richard L. Goodall named chairman and CEO of The Dixon Group. At the same time, fourth-generation leadership begins as Taylor Goodall is named President of The Dixon Group.
- 2019: Dixon Bayco moves into a new 40,000-square-foot building in West Chester, Ohio. In addition to offices, the location contains a training room, a clean room electronic assembly area, an engineering test lab, and a CNC manufacturing area.
- 2019: The new 150,000-square-foot Dixon distribution center in Chestertown, Maryland ships its first package.
- 2020: Dixon begins construction on a 100,000-square-foot manufacturing facility in Chestertown, Maryland.
- 2020: Dixon moves headquarters to a new 60,000-square-foot building in Chestertown, Maryland.
- 2021: Dixon Boss moves into a new 100,000-square-foot manufacturing facility in Chestertown, Maryland.

== Regions and divisions ==
Dixon Asia Pacific

Supplier of hose, valve, pipe and fitting packages to construction, mining and agricultural industries in Australia, India, China and Singapore.

Dixon Bayco (USA)

Manufacturers and supplies petroleum, dry bulk, and overfill detection products. Included in their line are products such as FloTech and ADS overfill detection, butterfly and swing check valves, hopper tees, pneumatic filtration systems, sight flow indicators, and tank truck vapor equipment.

Dixon Boss

Manufactures and supplies brands such as Air King couplings, and king combination nipples in addition to complete coupling systems such as Boss, LPS frac fittings, Holedall, and King Crimp. Eagle brand bellows seal valves round out their product offering.

Dixon Brass

Manufactures and supplies a variety of products such as brass ferrules, welding connectors, and pipe, push-on compression, and DOT air-break fittings.

Dixon Eagle

Designer, manufacturer and testing of zero emissions bellows seal gate and globe valves. Bellows seal valves eliminate fugitive emissions of toxic or regulated fluids and they prevent corrosive or harmful atmospheric conditions from entering the process, minimize maintenance and reduce life cycle costs in process plants including steam, cryogenic, heat transfer oil and vacuum systems. Bellows seals are considered zero-emission devices by the US Environmental Protection Agency.

Dixon Fire

Manufacturers and supplies a diverse line of fire protection products including valves, fire hoses, racks, reels, fire department connections, and Storz and LDH suction hose fittings.

Dixon Group Canada

Canadian distributor of products produced by the Dixon companies worldwide. Manufacturer of the “Bayco” product line of petroleum and dry bulk fittings and accessories used on tankers to transfer liquids or dry bulk materials from tankers to in-ground and above-ground storage facilities.

Dixon Group Europe

Supplier of industrial hoses, hose assemblies, couplings and fittings to customers in the United Kingdom and Europe.

Dixon Quick Coupling

Manufacturers and supplies a diverse range of hydraulic and pneumatic quick couplings including HT-AG series adapters, high-pressure TD-series fittings, and the Correct Connect color-coded system.

Dixon Sanitary

Supplies a full line of 304 and 316L stainless steel hygienic fittings, tubing, valves, pumps, filtration systems, and accessories such as instrumentation and sight glasses. All products meet the 3A standard for sanitary processing along with a number of the products meeting the EHDGE European Hygienic standard.

Dixon Specialty Products

Manufactures and supplies ball joint armored and PTFE hose assemblies, swivels, loading arms, and a full line of cam and groove fittings and accessories.

== Affiliate companies ==
- Buck Company - Foundry producing automated sand-cast, medium-to-high-volume castings in malleable iron, ductile iron and gray iron.
- Hydrasearch Company - Manufacturer and global distributor of hoses, technical products and fittings for commercial and military applications.
- Bearon Manufacturing, LLC. - Manufacturer and supplier of custom CNC machined parts, castings, prototypes, swaging products, welding, and pattern making. Additionally, provides fabrication and finishing services.
  - Yardley Inserts, LLC. - Manufactures threaded metal insert fasteners and serves a wide range of fastening applications for OEMs and various other industries.
  - Penn El - Specializes in the manufacturing and inventory of stuffing tubes and related items for military and commercial ships.
  - Bearon Aquatics - Manufactures and supplies equipment that serves the marine, aquaculture, golf course, wastewater, and landscaping industries.

Dixon sells its product lines primarily through industrial distributors. In concert with its distributors, the company conducts hose assembly safety surveys at plant facilities to identify performance problems and safety concerns or risks. Plant Engineering, May 2004, pp. 50–51 Dixon also operates a fleet of mobile training centers that visit manufacturing facilities, chemical plants and mining location to deliver product training and education to plant engineering and maintenance personnel.

== Patents ==
Dixon and its subsidiary companies hold patents on numerous coupling designs. A partial listing of patents that are currently in force includes:

Registration number	Word mark
6,679,291	Poppet valve assembly
5,092,364	Quick-action fluid coupling
5,255,714	Quick-action fluid coupling
5,306,051	Self-aligning and self-tightening hose coupling
5,540,250	Quick-disconnect fluid coupling
5,577,777	Ground joint coupling
6,158,717	Quick-action fluid coupling
6,692,207	One-piece metallic threaded insert
6,824,423	Socket assembly

== Trademarks ==
Dixon products are sold under various trade names registered with the U.S. Patent & Trademark Office. Among the trademarks are:

- Air King
- AS Artic Steel
- Batchguard
- Bayco
- Bayloc
- Boss
- Clever Clamp
- Correct Connect
- Dix-Lock
- Dixon Bayco
- Dixon Boss
- Dixon Eagle
- Dixon The Right Connection
- Dixon
- EZLink
- Flotech
- G J Boss
- Holedall
- Hydrasearch
- King Crimp
- KingCable
- Minsup
- Outalarm
- Powhatan
- Spillguard
- Sure-Lock
- The Dixon Driller
- Tuff-Lite
- Uncommon Excellence
- Vent-Lock
